The Kansas City Spurs were an American professional soccer team who played in the North American Soccer League, based in Kansas City, Missouri. They played their home games at Kansas City Municipal Stadium, former home of the Kansas City Chiefs, Kansas City Athletics, and Kansas City Royals. The club was previously known as the Chicago Spurs of the National Professional Soccer League but were relocated to Kansas City following the merger of the NPSL and the United Soccer Association to form the NASL in 1967. The Spurs won the NASL Championship in 1969 but were dissolved shortly after the 1970 NASL season. The club's colors were red and white.

History
The Kansas City Spurs were founded in 1968 following the merger of the National Professional Soccer League (NPSL) and the United Soccer Association (USA) to form the new first division professional league, the North American Soccer League (NASL). The team was relocated from Chicago, IL, where the Chicago Spurs had only played a single season in 1967 in the NPSL before the formation of the new league. The Spurs left for Kansas City to avoid competition with the Chicago Mustangs, who had also joined the NASL from the old USA.

Following the 1968 NASL season, the league was in trouble with ten franchises having folded. The 1969 season was split into two halves: The first half was called the International Cup, a double round robin tournament in which the remaining NASL clubs were represented by teams imported from the United Kingdom. The Spurs were represented by Wolverhampton Wanderers, who had won the 1967 United Soccer Association championship as the Los Angeles Wolves. The Spurs won the Cup with a 6–2–0 record. For the second half of the 1969 season, the teams returned to their normal rosters and played a 16-game schedule with no playoffs. The club would capture the regular season championship in the same season, with players such as Willy Roy and Pepe Fernandez, also leading the league in attendance with an average of 4,273 fans during the difficult year.

The Spurs finished in last place in the Northern Division in 1970 and ceased operations shortly thereafter.

The club was initially coached by Hungarian Janos Bedl, who would lead the club to victory in only its second season but he would be replaced the following year by English manager, Alan Rogers, who had debuted with the Chicago Spurs in 1967 and would return to coach the club for its final season in 1970.

Year-by-year

Honors 

NASL championships
 1969

NASL Season Premierships
 1969

NASL Division titles
 1968: Gulf Division

NASL International Cup
 1969

NASL Coach of the Year
 1969: Janos Bedl

NASL MVP
 1969: Pepe Fernández

All-Star first team selections
 1969: Leonel Conde, Pepe Fernández, Manfred Seissler, William Quiros
 1970: Manfred Seissler

All-Star second team selections
 1968: Eric Barber
 1970: Leonel Conde, Miranda Oliveira

U.S. Soccer Hall of Fame
 1989: Willy Roy

Canada Soccer Hall of Fame
 2008: Les Wilson

Indoor Soccer Hall of Fame
 2011: Don Popovic

Coaches
  Janos Bedl (1968-1969)
  Alan Rogers (1970)

See also
 Chicago Spurs
 Chicago Mustangs (1967–68)
 Kansas City Chiefs
 Sporting Kansas City

References

 
 
Association football clubs established in 1967
Association football clubs disestablished in 1970
Defunct soccer clubs in Missouri
North American Soccer League (1968–1984) teams
Wolverhampton Wanderers F.C.
Soccer clubs in Kansas City, Missouri
Soccer clubs in Missouri
1968 establishments in Missouri
1970 disestablishments in Missouri